is a Japanese character designer who is known for working with Osamu Dezaki and his designs on Golgo 13 and Space Adventure Cobra.

Filmography
 Astro Boy (1963)
 Kimba the White Lion (1965) – Character design

 Sabu to Ichi Torimono Hikae  (1968) – Animation
 A Thousand and One Nights (1969) – Original pictures
 Ashita no Joe (1970)
 Nobody's Boy Remi (1970) – Character design

 Aim for the Ace! (1973) – Design
 La Seine no Hoshi (1975) – Design
 Gaiking (1976) – Design and animation
 Famous World Fairy Tales (1976) – Animation
 Arrow Emblem Grand Prix no Taka (1977) – Design
 Jetter Mars (1977) – Design and animation
 3D Animation: Child Without a Home (1977) – Character design
 Treasure Island (1978) – Animation
 The Rose of Versailles (1979) – Design
 Animation Kikō Marco Polo no Bōken (1979) – Design
 Botchan (1980) – Animation
 Tom Sawyer (1980)  – Animation
 The Fantastic Adventures of Unico (1981) – Animation
 Space Adventure Cobra (1982) – Design and animation – also Space Adventure Cobra: The Movie (1982) and Cobra The Animation (2010)
 Cat's Eye  (1983)  – Character design
 Golgo 13: The Professional (1983)
 Oshin (1984) – Design
 Mighty Orbots (1985) – Design
 Nayuta (1986) – Design and animation
 They Were 11 (1986) – Design

 2001 Nights (1987) – Design

 Clan of Pihyoro (1988) – Design and animation
 Sea's Darkness, Moon's Shadow (1988) – Animation
 The Story of Riki (1989) – Design
 Starlight Nocturne (1989) – Design and animation
 B.B. (Burning Blood) (1990) – Design and animation
 Sword for Truth (1990) – Design and animation
 Reporter Blues (1990) – Design
 Brother Dearest (1991) – Design and animation
 In the Beginning: The Bible Stories (1992) – Animation
 Black Jack (1993) – Design and animation
 First Tram in Hiroshima  (1993)  – Design and animation
 Hakugei: Legend of the Moby Dick (1997) – Screenplay
 Golgo 13: Queen Bee (1998) – Design
 Boku no Son Goku (2003) – Director
 Phoenix  (2004) – Animation director
 Gin Tama (2005) – Animation
 The Snow Queen (2005) – Design
 Mokke (2007) – Animation
 Ultraviolet: Code 044 (2008) – Character design

Notes

Bibliography
 Akio Sugino Drawings (1982) – 
 Hakugei Densetsu Artbook (1994) –

References

 Book references

External links
 

1944 births
Anime directors
Japanese film directors
Anime character designers
Madhouse (company) people
Japanese animators
Living people